Dairyville is an unincorporated community in Tehama County, California, United States.

References

Unincorporated communities in California
Unincorporated communities in Tehama County, California